Ivana Ljubas (born 31 October 1985, in Livno) is a handball player from Bosnia and Herzegovina who plays for Slovenian top division side GEN-I Zagorje.

References

1985 births
Living people
Sportspeople from Livno
Bosnia and Herzegovina female handball players
Expatriate handball players
Bosnia and Herzegovina expatriate sportspeople in Slovenia
Bosnia and Herzegovina expatriate sportspeople in Hungary
Békéscsabai Előre NKSE players